Domagoj Franić (born 17 August 1993) is a Croatian professional footballer who plays as a centre-back for NK Solin.

Career

Early career
Franić started off his professional playing career at Split in 2012. After Split, Franić played primarily for 2. HNL and 3. HNL clubs Dugopolje, Mosor and Lučko. After that, he went to Hajduk Split, but never got a chance at Hajduk and mostly played for the second team. After Hajduk, from 2016 to 2017 he played for Gorica in the 2. HNL.

Radnik Bijeljina
On 20 January 2017, Franić signed with Bosnian Premier League club Radnik Bijeljina. He made his debut for Radnik on 25 February 2017 in a 2–0 win against Olimpik. With the club, Franić won the Republika Srpska Cup in 2017 and 2018. He left Radnik on 18 January 2019, 2 years after joining the club.

Slovácko
On 31 January 2019, Franić signed with Czech First League club Slovácko.

NK Uskok
In July 2020, it was announced that Franić joined third-tier NK Uskok in Croatia.

Career statistics

Club

Honours
Radnik Bijeljina
Republika Srpska Cup: 2016–17, 2017–18

References

External links

Domagoj Franić at Sofascore

1993 births
Living people
Footballers from Split, Croatia
Association football central defenders
Croatian footballers
RNK Split players
NK Dugopolje players
NK Mosor players
NK Lučko players
HNK Hajduk Split II players
HNK Gorica players
FK Radnik Bijeljina players
1. FC Slovácko players
NK Uskok players
NK Solin players
Croatian Football League players
First Football League (Croatia) players
Second Football League (Croatia) players
Premier League of Bosnia and Herzegovina players
Czech First League players
Croatian expatriate footballers
Expatriate footballers in Bosnia and Herzegovina
Croatian expatriate sportspeople in Bosnia and Herzegovina
Expatriate footballers in the Czech Republic
Croatian expatriate sportspeople in the Czech Republic